William Washburn may refer to:

 William Washburn (architect) (1808–1890), architect and city councilor in Boston, Massachusetts
 William B. Washburn (1820–1887), American politician representing Massachusetts
 William D. Washburn (1831–1912), American politician representing Minnesota
 William Henry Washburn, American politician in Wisconsin